Nügədi or Nyugedy or Nyugedi may refer to:
Birinci Nügədi, Azerbaijan
İkinci Nügədi, Azerbaijan